Thrush Hour:  A Study of the Great Ladies of Jazz is Stephanie Nakasian's sixth album as leader.  It was released in 2006.

The album features Nakasian paying tribute to twenty of jazz's great female singers.  Nakasian's intention, as stated in the liner notes, is to emulate and mimic their styles and inflections in order to bring a sense of authenticity back to vocal jazz.

The extensive liner notes include a short biography of each singer as well as Nakasian's description of how she endeavors to achieve their unique sound.

All of the arrangements were taken from the originals and prepared by Nakasian and Hod O'Brien.

Track listing

Personnel
Performers
Stephanie Nakasian - vocals
Hod O'Brien - piano
Randy Sandke - trumpet
Tom Hamilton - tenor saxophone
John Jensen - trombone
Howie Collins - rhythm guitar
Steve Gillmore - bass
Bill Goodwin - drums

Other Personnel
Session Producer - Stephanie Nakasian
Engineer - Kent Heckman
Editing and Mastering - Bill Goodwin
Liner Notes - Scott Yanow, Stephanie Nakasian
Photos - Stephen Poffenberger, The Wayne Knight Collection, Cynthia Sesso
Booklet Design - Mario Levesque

References

Stephanie Nakasian albums
2006 albums